Korea Liaison Office, also known as a KLO Unit or 8240 Unit, was a South Korean military intelligence unit formed in 1949.

History 
On June 1, 1949, the Korea Liaison Office formed by United States Far East Command's chief of intelligence Charles A. Willoughby for clandestine missions inside North Korea.

Like Korean Augmentation To the United States Army, Korea Liaison Office was part of the United States Far East Command, but most members were South Korean.

Korea Liaison Office carried out military intelligence, espionage, clandestine operations, special operations, infiltration missions, special reconnaissance, guerrilla warfare, sabotage during the Korean War under United Nations Command.

In July 1951, Korea Liaison Office was incorporated into the 8240th Army Unit.

See also
 8240th Army Unit
 Joint Advisory Commission, Korea
 United Nations Partisan Infantry Korea

References

Further reading 
 Guerrilla Warfare History of Korean War - Institute for Military History in South Korea Ministry of National Defense 
 Facets of the U.S. Army Guerrilla Commands in Korea - U.S. ARMY SPECIAL OPERATIONS COMMAND HISTORY OFFICE
 Korean War Special Operations
 Korea Liaison Office Documentary - South Korea Ministry of National Defense TV

United Nations Partisan Infantry Korea
Military units and formations established in 1949
Military units and formations disestablished in 1953
Army reconnaissance units and formations
Military units and formations of South Korea in the Korean War
Military units and formations of the United States in the Korean War
Guerrilla organizations